Edward or Eddie Parker may refer to:

Edward Parker, 12th Baron Morley (1550–1618), English peer
Edward Parker (cricketer) (born 1939), Zimbabwean cricketer
Edward Griffin Parker (1825–1868), United States lawyer, editor and author
Edward Harper Parker (1849–1926), English Chinese scholar
Edward Hazen Parker (1823–1896), American physician and poet
Edward Lutwyche Parker (1785–1850), United States (Londonderry, N.H.) Presbyterian clergyman
Edward M. Parker (1855–1925), bishop of the Episcopal Church in the United States
Edward N. Parker (1904–1989), American admiral
Edward Stone Parker (1802–1865), Methodist preacher and assistant Protector of Aborigines
Eddie Parker (actor) (1900–1960), stuntman and actor
Eddie Parker (musician) (born 1959), English jazz flautist and composer
Eddie Parker, character in Inheritance (2020 film)

See also
Ned Parker, fictional character in Neighbours
Ed Parker (1931–1990), American martial artist